Arttu Hoskonen (born 16 April 1997) is a Finnish professional footballer who plays as a centre-back for Polish club Cracovia and the Finland national team.

Career
Hoskonen has played for Inter Turku. He signed a two-year contract with HJK starting in 2022.

On 23 January 2023, Hoskonen joined Polish Ekstraklasa club Cracovia on a two-and-a-half year contract.

References

1997 births
Living people
People from Kaarina
Finnish footballers
Association football defenders
Finland youth international footballers
Finland international footballers
FC Inter Turku players
Helsingin Jalkapalloklubi players
MKS Cracovia (football) players
Veikkausliiga players
Ekstraklasa players
Finnish expatriate footballers
Expatriate footballers in Poland
Finnish expatriate sportspeople in Poland